"Shout Out to My Ex" is a song recorded by British girl group Little Mix. It was released on 16 October 2016 by Syco Music, as the lead single from the group's fourth studio album Glory Days (2016). A dance-pop and power pop song, it was co-written by Little Mix and lyrically addresses moving on from an ex after an unhappy relationship. The song has been cited as a girl power and breakup anthem and received highly positive reviews from music critics, for its empowering message, production and the group's vocal performance.

"Shout Out to My Ex" spent three weeks at number one on the UK Singles Chart, and was the only UK number one of that year to be led by a female lead. It was Little Mix's first single to be certified double and triple platinum in the country and currently holds the record for the most streamed girl group single there. As of 2022, it has sold over 2 million copies in the UK alone and remains as their best-selling single, as well as the second-best selling girl group single released in the UK behind "Wannabe", by the Spice Girls. At the 37th Brit Awards Ceremony, the group won British Single of the Year.

The single also peaked at number one in Ireland and Scotland and topped the official Big Top 40 and Euro Digital Sales Charts, and reached the top ten in New Zealand and Australia. It charted in twenty three other territories and reached number sixty nine on the US Billboard Hot 100. The song has been certified triple platinum in Australia and Brazil, certified gold in five other countries and certified platinum in four others. Little Mix have performed "Shout Out to My Ex" at numerous shows and events including the BBC Teen Awards, Jingle Bell Ball, LOS40 Music Awards 2016, and the 37th Brit Awards, in which their performance is ranked as one of the best ever.

Composition 
According to sheet music published by Sony/ATV Music Publishing on Musicnotes.com, "Shout Out to My Ex" is composed in the key of F major and set in common time at a moderate tempo of 126 beats per minute. Little Mix's voices range from F3 to a high A5. The lyrics are about getting over a past relationship.

Critical reception
Idolators Rachel Sonis described the song as a "kiss-off anthem at its finest" and remarked that it felt like "a confident comeback for the group". Emilee Linder from Fuse said that the song was a "Taylor Swift–like move to play into the media's narrative", and praised Perrie's "husky vocals".

Billboard ranked "Shout Out to My Ex" at number 58 on their "100 Best Pop Songs of 2016" list, acknowledging the song's "power-chord-pumped unison chorus that demands to be sung at the top of one's lungs".

At the 2017 Brit Awards "Shout Out to My Ex" won Little Mix their first ever Brit Award for British Single of the Year.

Digital Spy, ranked "Shout Out To My Ex" as number three of the best pop songs of 2016.

Official Charts Company, named "Shout Out To My Ex" as one of the biggest songs of 2016.

Teen Vogue ranked the song as one of the best breakup songs.

Attitude ranked the song #9 on their list of 32 greatest Little Mix singles writing "although it has a very simple pop formula, the blissful chorus still works as that fist-pumping earworm."

According to the Official Charts "Shout Out To My Ex" was named as one of the most streamed songs of all time in the UK.

Chart performance
"Shout Out to My Ex" debuted at number one on the UK Singles Chart, with 95,000 combined sales to give the band their fourth UK number one of their careers, following "Cannonball" in 2011, "Wings" in 2012 and "Black Magic" in 2015. It was the third single from 2016 to debut straight in at the top of the UK charts with only four days of sales tracking. "Shout Out to My Ex" was also the first UK number one single of 2016 with a female lead, as the three women with number one singles earlier in the year, Kyla, MØ and Halsey, were all featured artists. It remained at number one the following week, making it Little Mix's second song (after "Black Magic") to spend multiple weeks at number 1. It was certified silver by the BPI for selling over 200,000 copies in its second week. It spent a third week before being replaced by "Rockabye" by Clean Bandit. In 2016 it was ranked as the 39th biggest single in the United Kingdom, and ranked as the second best selling girl group single (with combined sales and streams). Between 2010 and 2019 "Shout Out To My Ex" song was ranked as the eighty-six biggest song of the decade in the United Kingdom.

As of 2021, it is the group's best-selling single, as well as the second-best selling girl group single released in the United Kingdom, behind "Wannabe", by the Spice Girls. It was their first single to be certified triple platinum in the UK and holds the record for the most streamed girl group song in the country with over 196 million streams.

Outside of the United Kingdom it debuted at number six in Ireland and in its second week reached number one, making it Little Mix's third number-one single there, following "Cannonball" and "Wings". It also reached number one in Scotland. It peaked in the top ten of the charts in both Australia and New Zealand. In New Zealand it became the group's highest-charting song there and their first top ten single. In Australia it debuted at number 16 on the Australian ARIA Charts, and in its second week rose 12 places to number four. This made it Little Mix's second top-five single in Australia, following "Wings", which peaked at number three.

"Shout Out to My Ex" was the highest peak for a Little Mix song in many European countries. In the US, the song debuted at number four on the Bubbling Under Hot 100 Singles chart. The following week, it debuted on the Billboard Hot 100 at number 69, making it the group's last single to chart there. It also reached number 30 on the Digital Songs chart, Little Mix's highest placing on that particular list to date. It charted inside the top thirty in a total of nine other countries including Austria, Finland, and Canada, where it debuted at number 37  on the Canadian Hot 100, becoming their first top 40 single there. It would go on to chart in eleven other countries including the Netherlands and Germany.

Music video
The video is set in the Tabernas Desert in Almería, Spain, and was released at 12:00 BST on 20 October 2016 on Vevo. Directed by Sarah Chatfield, the band hangs out in a trailer, takes a drive along a highway lined with lavender-coloured trees and poses by a pool. Filming took place in June 2016 whilst the girls were on their Get Weird Tour. As of 2021, it has been streamed over 400 million times on YouTube.

Live performances
"Shout Out to My Ex" received its debut performance on the second results show of The X Factor in 2016, in which the group started in a car outside its recording studios, flanked by female cheerleaders in T-shirts with the names of male and female exes on them, which the cheerleaders removed towards the end of the song. On 21 October 2016, they performed the song on the Belgian TV show Jonas & Van Geel. Two days later, they performed the song on the Radio 1 Teen Awards. They also made an appearance and performed the single on the Norwegian program Senkveld on November 3. On November 13, they gave a performance on the Australian TV show, Sunrise, and performed the next day for the semi-final week of The X Factor Australia. Four days later, they performed the single on BBC's Children In Need, and two days later gave an acoustic performance on Sunday Brunch. Then, they gave a performance on The X Factor Italy on 24 November. On December 1, the group took to the LOS40 Music Awards stage and performed their hit single. They performed the song on The Today Show in 2016, and later again in 2017. An unplugged performance was delivered for Paper Magazine in January 2017. They also performed the song acoustically on iHeart Radio's Honda Stage on 2 February 2017.

In March 2017, the group performed a mashup of "Shout Out to My Ex" and "Touch" on the Nickelodeon Kids' Choice Awards, where they altered the lyrics of "Touch" to make it more kid-friendly. On 22 February, Little Mix kicked off the Brit Awards by giving a fiery performance of the song. The members, who were carried to the stage on huge silver platforms, all had blonde wigs and wore futuristic black and silver outfits, while the stage was lit in a hot-pink color.

They gave another performance of the song on the Radio 1 Teen Awards in 2018. In August 2020, Little Mix held a virtual concert called Little Mix Uncancelled where they performed some of their hits, including "Shout Out to My Ex".

Over the years, the group has performed the song in many music festivals, like the Jingle Bell Ball in 2016 and 2018, the Summertime Ball in 2017, the Fusion Festival in 2017 and 2019, the Big Weekend festival in 2017 and 2019, and the Popspring festival in 2018. Little Mix has also included "Shout Out to My Ex" on every single tour set list since its release — the Dangerous Woman Tour in 2017, where the group supported Ariana Grande in North America; the Summer Shout Out Tour in 2017, where the song served as the final number; The Glory Days Tour (2017-2018), where they performed the song as an encore while wearing black t-shirts with the word "Ex" written in silver glitter; the Summer Hits Tour in 2018, where it was the last song before the encore; the LM5 Tour in 2019; and The Confetti Tour in 2022, where it was the first song on the set list. Since the tour was held after Nelson's departure from the group in 2020, Thirlwall covered Nelson's verse.

Accolades

Charts

Weekly charts

Year-end charts

Decade-end charts

Certifications

Release history

References

External links

2016 songs
2016 singles
Little Mix songs
Syco Music singles
Irish Singles Chart number-one singles
Number-one singles in Scotland
UK Singles Chart number-one singles
Songs about heartache
Songs about infidelity
Songs written by Kamille (musician)
Songs written by Iain James
Brit Award for British Single